Lycinus caldera is a mygalomorph spider of Chile, named after its type locality: Caldera, Copiapó, Region III. Males are distinguished from L. gajardoi by the larger cymbium, the thinner and more numerous modified cymbial setae and the shorter embolus, and from those of all other species in the tribe by having cymbial setae directed backwards. Females are distinguished from other Chilean species of Lycinus by the spermathecae with two or three receptacula on each side.

Description
Female: total length ; cephalothorax length , width ; cephalic region length , width ; fovea width ; medial ocular quadrangle length , width ; labium length , width ; sternum length , width . Its cephalic region is strongly convex, highland wide short. Its labium lacks cuspules; serrula is absent. The sternum is strongly rebordered. Chelicerae: rastellum is strong, formed by numerous blunt cusps on the anterior face (similar to the rastellum of L. longipes). The entire spider is a uniform dark blackish-reddish-brown colour, with no abdominal pattern.
Male: total length ; cephalothorax length , width ; cephalic region 0.58 of the cephalothorax width; fovea width 0.08 of cephalothorax width; labium length 0.73 of width; sternum width 0.85 of length. Its labium possesses no cuspules. Its serrula is well evident, and the posterior sternal sigilla is long and well separated from margin. The entire spider is a uniform blackish brown colour, while the abdomen lacks a discernible pattern.

Distributionand Behaviour
Known only from provinces of Chañaral and Copiapó, in northern Region III, Chile.

The spider is found in long, deep burrows (closed with a double flap typical of the Chilean Lycinus) in sandy, desertic locations. The internal burrow's lining forms a dense, thick tube which prevents sand from collapsing.

See also
Spider anatomy
List of Nemesiidae species
Regions of Chile

References

External links

ADW entry

Nemesiidae
Spiders of South America
Spiders described in 1995
Endemic fauna of Chile